The Steve Tshwete Local Municipality is a Local Municipality in Mpumalanga, South Africa. The council consists of fifty-eight members elected by mixed-member proportional representation. Twenty-nine councillors are elected by first-past-the-post voting in twenty-nine wards, while the remaining twenty-nine are chosen from party lists so that the total number of party representatives is proportional to the number of votes received. In the election of 1 November 2021 no party won a majority on the council. The African National Congress (ANC) was the largest party, winning twenty-one seats.

Results 
The following table shows the composition of the council after past elections.

December 2000 election

The following table shows the results of the 2000 election.

March 2006 election

The following table shows the results of the 2006 election.

May 2011 election

The following table shows the results of the 2011 election.

August 2016 election

The following table shows the results of the 2016 election.

By-elections from August 2016 to November 2021
The following by-elections were held to fill vacant ward seats in the period from August 2016 to November 2021.

In the October 2018 by-election, the ANC candidate retained ward 25 for the party. The ANC's share dropped from 79% in the 2016 election to 70%, while the Economic Freedom Fighters (EFF) candidate almost doubled their party's share of the vote to 30%.

November 2021 election

The following table shows the results of the 2021 election.

References

Steve Tshwete